The Maxim–Tokarev was the first domestic Soviet light machine gun accepted for service. It was developed from the Maxim machine gun M1910 by Fedor Tokarev

History 
During World War I and the Russian Civil War, the Soviet army was equipped with light machine guns of foreign manufacture, mostly with the Lewis gun, the Chauchat and the Hotchkiss M1909. By the 1920s, these guns were showing their age, and owing to the Soviet Union's international diplomatic isolation, neither spare parts nor ammunition could be easily obtained for these guns.

In 1923 GAU emergency program was initiated for equipping the Red army with a light machine gun chambered for the domestic 7.62×54mmR.

The first design submitted was the Maxim-Kolesnikov, designed by Ivan Nikolaevich Kolesnikov at the Kovrov Arms Factory, followed soon thereafter by the Maxim–Tokarev, designed by Fedor Vasilievich Tokarev at the Tula Arsenal. During field tests conducted in early 1925, Tokarev's model proved superior, so it was adopted on May 26.

Of the 2,500 Maxim–Tokarev guns were produced by Tula arms factory (TOZ) in 1926–27; 1,400 were supplied to China between 1938 and 1939 in the Sino-Soviet Aid Program. The rest were sent to the Republican forces during the Spanish Civil War It was replaced in Soviet service by the much lighter DP.

Structure 
A US Army analysis mentions that "Tokarev was doubtless inspired by both the German Parabellum and the British Vickers. The arrangement of the trigger and the shoulder stock resembles very strongly that illustrated in United States Patent No. 942167, which was granted in 1909 to Dawson and Buckham, assignors to Vickers."

The water jacket of the Maxim M1910 was discarded and replaced by a thin perforated steel jacket. A mechanism for changing the barrel in field conditions was provided. The spade grips were replaced with a rifle-type stock and the thumb-trigger was replaced by a rifle-type trigger. A folding bipod with tubular legs was attached to the barrel jacket.

The canvas-belt feed system was the same as on PM M1910 guns, except the standard belt capacity was reduced to 100 rounds. The 100-round belts were usually carried in separate drum-type containers, inspired from the German MG 08/15.

Users

See also
 Browning M1919
 PV-1 machine gun
 List of Russian weaponry

References

External links 

 https://web.archive.org/web/20081217150403/http://world.guns.ru/machine/mg56-e.htm
 7.62 Maxim-Tokarev with the Tokarev son and father

Light machine guns
Machine guns of the Soviet Union
7.62×54mmR machine guns
Tula Arms Plant products